Kymmendö is an island in the south of the Stockholm archipelago. Kymmendö is the model for the fictional island Hemsö in August Strindberg's novel The People of Hemsö.

References

Islands of Haninge Municipality
Islands of the Stockholm archipelago